Chmielowszczyzna-Kolonia  is a village in the administrative district of Gmina Szudziałowo, within Sokółka County, Podlaskie Voivodeship, in north-eastern Poland. It is near the border with Belarus.

References

Chmielowszczyzna-Kolonia